Kerim Afşar (13 August 1930 – 26 September 2003) was a Turkish actor who played various roles in theater, movies and TV series. During his career, the actor also directed several movies and also played as voice actor in some of his movies.

Biography 
He was graduated from Ankara State Conservatory in 1953. Due to WW2 Afşar and his family moved to Gelibolu. He started his career by performed in various plays even before his graduation in 1952. His first role was "Oberon" character in A Midsummer Night's Dream play written by Carl Elberth. He played in many characters and acted as voice actor in "Radio Theater" programs in TRT (Turkish TV channel). In 1980, he continued his career in Berlin, Germany by the invitation of Peter Stein in order to play in his plays. After returning to Turkey, he joined in Ankara Art Theater (AST) and continued to his career here while also performing in Istanbul City Theater. Afşar passed away on September 26, 2003.

Selected filmography 
 Yaprak Dökümü - 1988
 Perry Mason - 1983
 Mine - 1982
 Çekiç ve Titreşim - 1979
 Emekli Başkan - 1979
 Isı - 1979
 Kuma - 1979
 Arkadaş - 1974
 Mevlana - 1973
 Battal Gazi Destanı - 1971
 Yılan Soyu - 1969
 Çalıkuşu - 1966

References

External links 

1930 births
2003 deaths
Male actors from Istanbul
Turkish male film actors
Turkish male stage actors
Turkish expatriates in Germany
20th-century Turkish male actors